Red Rose for Gregory is an 11-track album by reggae artist, Gregory Isaacs released in 1988 by RAS Records. The album combines the style and sound of lovers rock with roots reggae and it features the hit, "Rumours".

Track listing
 "Red Rose for Gregory" (Hopeton Lindo) - 4:09
 "Teacher's Plight" (12" Promo Mix) - 6:05
 "Break the Date" - 3:31
 "Rumours" (12" Hit Mix) (Carlton Hines) - 6:12 
 "Slow Down" (Hopeton Lindo) - 4:19
 "All I Need Is You" - 3:58
 "Rough Neck" (Featuring The Mighty Diamonds)(12" Street Mix)- 6:53
 "Intimate Potential" (Allan Clarke, Lloyd Ferguson) - 4:19
 "Me No In A Dat" - 3:45
 "Closer Than a Brother" - 3:58
 "Mind Yu Dis" (12" Manners Mix) (Hopeton Lindo) - 5:22

Personnel
Gregory Isaacs - vocals
The Mighty Diamonds - harmony vocals on "Rough Neck"
Cleveland "Clevie" Browne - drums
Dalton Brownie - guitar
Dean Fraser - saxophone
Wycliffe "Steely" Johnson - bass, piano
J.C. Lodge - harmony vocals 
Mikey Bennett - backing vocals
Robert Lyn - synthesizer, piano, synth horns, programming
Dwight Pinkney - guitar
Danny Browne - bass
Technical
Courtney Small - assistant producer, engineer
Steven Stanley - mixing, engineer

References

1988 albums
Gregory Isaacs albums
Greensleeves Records albums